Brierley is a town and Grimethorpe is a village in the North East Ward in the metropolitan borough of Barnsley, South Yorkshire, England.  The ward contains six listed buildings that are recorded in the National Heritage List for England.  Of these, one is listed at Grade II*, the middle of the three grades, and the others are at Grade II, the lowest grade.  The listed buildings consist of three houses, a farmhouse, a milepost, and a church.


Key

Buildings

References

Citations

Sources

 

Lists of listed buildings in South Yorkshire
Buildings and structures in the Metropolitan Borough of Barnsley
Listed